Llantarnam railway station in Llantarnam village, Cwmbran in Torfaen, South Wales, UK  was built as part of the Pontypool, Caerleon and Newport Railway.

History
The station was opened by the Pontypool, Caerleon and Newport Railway on 21 December 1874. The Great Western Railway advertised in January 1877 for tenders for the construction of a station and station yard at Pontygarnedd. Pont-y-carnedd is shown near the railway on the 1882 1:2,500 Ordnance Survey map, just to the north of Llanvihangel Llantarnam. It first appeared in Bradshaw in August 1878.

The station closed to passengers on 30 April 1962, with the goods yard remaining in use until 7 September 1963.

The 2 platform station lay to the north of the current Newport Road bridge, and alongside the Burton's biscuit factory. Further north at Llantarnam Junction, the extension line built by the Great Western Railway, opened in April 1878, diverged to the north west towards Cwmbran (GWR) railway station.  The former station is located on the Welsh Marches Line.

References

Notes

Sources

External links
Pictures and local information
Station on a navigable 1947 O.S. map

Disused railway stations in Torfaen
Railway stations in Great Britain opened in 1874
Railway stations in Great Britain closed in 1962
Former Great Western Railway stations
Cwmbran